A status referendum was held on the island of Sint Maarten on 22 June 2000.

Background
After the 1994 referendum failed to show support for a separate status for Sint Maarten, the island council of Sint Maarten organized a new referendum in June 2000. This referendum came out in favour of a separate status for Sint Maarten as a country within the Kingdom of the Netherlands, and sparked a new series of referendums across the Netherlands Antilles.

Results

See also
Dissolution of the Netherlands Antilles
2004 Bonaire status referendum
2004 Saban status referendum
2005 Curaçao status referendum
2005 Sint Eustatius status referendum

References

Referendums in Sint Maarten
Referendums in the Netherlands Antilles
2000 in the Netherlands Antilles
2000 referendums
Sint Maarten
June 2000 events in North America